Paranephelium hainanensis is a species of plant in the family Sapindaceae. It is endemic to China. It is threatened by habitat loss.

References

Flora of China
hainanensis
Endangered plants
Taxonomy articles created by Polbot